

126001–126100 

|-bgcolor=#f2f2f2
| colspan=4 align=center | 
|}

126101–126200 

|-id=160
| 126160 Fabienkuntz || 2002 AF || Fabien Kuntz (born 1983), a French meteorite hunter and popular science writer from Besançon. || 
|}

126201–126300 

|-id=245
| 126245 Kandókálmán ||  || Kálmán Kandó (1869–1931), Hungarian engineer, one of the creators of the electric railway (the discovery occurred on his 133rd birth anniversary) || 
|}

126301–126400 

|-id=315
| 126315 Bláthy ||  || Ottó Bláthy (1860–1939), Hungarian electrical engineer || 
|}

126401–126500 

|-id=444
| 126444 Wylie ||  || Wylie Erwin Reeves (1967–2006), American historian and high-school teacher || 
|-id=445
| 126445 Prestonreeves ||  || W. Preston Reeves (born 1935), American chemistry professor emeritus at Texas Lutheran University || 
|}

126501–126600 

|-id=578
| 126578 Suhhosoo ||  || Ho Soo Suh (1736–1799), Korean scientist responsible for most of the astronomical and arithmetical projects || 
|}

126601–126700 

|-bgcolor=#f2f2f2
| colspan=4 align=center | 
|}

126701–126800 

|-id=748
| 126748 Mariegerbet || 2002 DP || Marie Gerbet (born 1989), a French meteorite hunter || 
|-id=749
| 126749 Johnjones ||  || John Jones (1927–2006), American astronomy popularizer, president of the Chicago Astronomical Society and general chairman of Astrofest || 
|-id=780
| 126780 Ivovasiljev ||  || Ivo Vasiljev (born 1935) is a Czech linguist, translator, teacher and orientalist dealing with the Korean, Chinese, Japanese and Vietnamese languages. || 
|}

126801–126900 

|-id=888
| 126888 Tspitzer ||  || Thomas J. Spitzer (born 1957) was the Electrical Power Systems Engineer on more than a dozen Goddard missions, including the highly successful Lunar Reconnaissance Orbiter that re-mapped the moon, as well as the OSIRIS-REx asteroid sample-return mission. || 
|}

126901–127000 

|-
| 126901 Craigstevens ||  || Craig L. Stevens (born 1978) is the Project Verification Systems Engineer for the OSIRIS-REx asteroid sample-return mission. Prior to serving in this role, he participated in the development of flight systems for several NASA missions including JWST, MESSENGER, GPM, New Horizons, LRO, LADEE and Landsat 8. || 
|-id=905
| 126905 Junetveekrem ||  || June Tveekrem (born 1960) contributed to the OSIRIS-REx asteroid sample-return mission as an optical engineer. As an expert in optical modeling and analysis, she performed stray light analyses for OVIRS and sun glint analyses for the overall OSIRIS-REx mission. || 
|-id=906
| 126906 Andykulessa ||  || Andrew "Andy" S. Kulessa (born 1960) is an Australian scientist who is an expert on tropospheric propagation phenomena, and of micro- and meso-scale meteorological effects on electronic communications. He is an active researcher in astrophysical phenomena, stellar/galactic dynamics, and characteristics of variable stars. || 
|-id=965
| 126965 Neri ||  || Rodolfo Neri Vela (born 1952) is the first Mexican person to travel to space. In 1985, he was a payload specialist on the Space Shuttle Atlantis. During the flight, he conducted experiments, including many on the subject of human physiology. || 
|}

References 

126001-127000